Panchagarh-1 is a constituency represented in the Jatiya Sangsad (National Parliament) of Bangladesh since 2019 by Mazharul Haque Prodhan of the Awami League.

Boundaries 
The constituency encompasses Atwari, Panchagarh Sadar, and Tetulia upazilas.

History 
The constituency was created in 1984 from the Dinajpur-2 constituency when the former Dinajpur District was split into three districts: Panchagarh, Thakurgaon, and Dinajpur.

Members of Parliament

Elections

Elections in the 2010s

Elections in the 2000s

Elections in the 1990s

References

External links
 

Parliamentary constituencies in Bangladesh
Panchagarh District
Rangpur Division